Nadia Fettah Alaoui (born 1971, Rabat) is a Moroccan entrepreneur and politician. Since October she is the current Minister of Economy and Finance in the Cabinet of Aziz Akhannoush

Early life and education 
She was born in 1971 in Rabat, Morocco. After studying in her hometown and graduating from the Lycée Dar Essalam, she pursued higher studies which led her to the École des Hautes Etudes Commerciales de Paris (HEC Paris), in Jouy-en-Josas from which she graduated in 1997.

Professional career 
In 1997, she began her professional career as a consultant for the audit firm Arthur Andersen in Paris. In 2000, she created and managed in Casablanca a private equity company called Maroc Invest Finances Group. She worked at different positions in Saham, eventually becoming its General Director in 2017. She resigned before she assumed her role as the Minister of Economy and Finance in the Moroccan government.

Political career 
Since 2019 she has served as the Minister of Tourism, Handicrafts, Air Transport and Social Economy in the Cabinet of Saadeddine Othmani. She was appointed to this post on 7 October 2021.

Personal life 
She is married and has two children.

Award 
2018 CEO of the Year at the African CEO Forum in Abidjan

References 

Living people
1971 births
Moroccan Muslims
People from Rabat
21st-century Moroccan women politicians
21st-century Moroccan politicians
Women government ministers of Morocco
Finance ministers of Morocco